Disney Rodríguez (born 27 September 1985) is a Cuban freestyle wrestler. He competed in the freestyle 120 kg event at the 2008 Summer Olympics, where he lost the bronze medal match to David Musul'bes.

References

1985 births
Living people
Cuban male sport wrestlers
Olympic wrestlers of Cuba
Wrestlers at the 2008 Summer Olympics
Pan American Games medalists in wrestling
Pan American Games bronze medalists for Cuba
Wrestlers at the 2011 Pan American Games
Place of birth missing (living people)
Medalists at the 2011 Pan American Games
Olympic medalists in wrestling
Olympic bronze medalists for Cuba
20th-century Cuban people
21st-century Cuban people